Zazid is a village in the City Municipality of Koper in the Littoral region of Slovenia on the border with Croatia.

The local church is dedicated to Saint Martin and belongs to the Parish of Predloka.

References

External links

Zazid on Geopedia

Populated places in the City Municipality of Koper